Cimitero delle Porte Sante (The Sacred Doors Cemetery) is a monumental cemetery in Florence located within the fortified bastion of the Basilica of San Miniato al Monte.

History 
The idea of a burial site near San Miniato was conceived around 1837, although the camposanto was inaugurated eleven years later, in 1848.

The project, originally entrusted to architect Niccolò Matas (the designer of the facade of the Basilica of Santa Croce), was enlarged and in 1864 Mariano Falcini used the area of the sixteenth-century fortress lying around the church.

The project of the new cemetery grew parallel with the development of the new road network, elaborated by Poggi, which, with the opening of the Colli Boulevard and the monumental staircase, created new ways to access the basilica.

Notable tombs 
In addition to many neo-Gothic architectural features, the cemetery holds the burial sites of many illustrious figures, including:
 Giuseppe Abbati
 Libero Andreotti
 Pietro Annigoni
 Pellegrino Artusi
 Lazar Berman
 Luigi Bertelli (Vamba)
 Alessandro Bonsanti
 Mario Cecchi Gori (with his wife Valeria)
 Anna Maria Chiavacci Leonardi
 Alimondo Ciampi
 Bruno Cicognani
 Carlo Collodi
 Enrico Coveri
 Felice Le Monnier
 Claudio Leonardi
 Guido Manacorda
 Ferruccio Masini
 Lorenzo Orsetti
 Giovanni Papini
 Marietta Piccolomini
 Ermenegildo Pistelli
 Paolo Poli
 Vasco Pratolini
 Rodolfo Marma
 Renzo Ricci
 Brass Roses
 Bruno Rossi
 Gaetano Salvemini
 Tommaso Salvini
 Giorgio Saviane
 Odoardo Spadaro
 Giovanni Spadolini
 Angelo Torchi
 Luigi Ugolini
 Pasquale Villari

Notes 
 Foresto Niccolai (ed.), The urns of the strong, monuments and burial inscriptions , Coppini Tipografi, Florence, September 1997.
 Valeria Paniccia, Walking in the meadows of eternity , Mursia Editore, 2013
 Aldi there of the Holy Doors – Studies of conservation and restoration of the burial monuments, Florence, Palazzo Spinelli, 2016

External links

References 

Cemeteries in Florence
Catholic cemeteries in Europe
Gothic Revival architecture in Italy
1837 establishments in Italy
Monuments and memorials in Florence